Kondazhy Tritham Tali Siva Temple (IAST: koṇṭāḻi tr̥ttaṁtaḷi śiva kṣētraṁ) a Hindu temple, dedicated to Shiva situated on the banks of Gayathripuzha, a tributary of Bharathappuzha, at Kondazhy of Thrissur District in Kerala state in India. The Kondazhy Temple is one of the important temples in Kingdom of Cochin. According to legends, sage Parashurama installed the idol of Lord Shiva at the south bank of river Nila. The temple is a part of the 108 famous Shiva temples in Kerala.

History
During Chera rule, Kerala was divided into eighteen tiers for the administration; each tier headed by a major temple (Shiva temple). In these, the Tritam Tali Siva Temple is the central temple of the tree. There is a special temple dedicated to Goddess Parvathi in the premises, and also houses 11 sub-deities, including the three sons of Lord Shiva (Ganapathi, Subrahmanya and Ayyappan), Mahavishnu, Bhadrakali, Navagrahas, Hanuman, Serpent deities and Brahmarakshassu.

Tipu's attack
This temple is said to have been destroyed during Tipu Sultan's conquest reign while his invasion of Kerala. After that, for nearly two hundred years, the sculpture of the Maha temple has been broken up.

See also
 108 Shiva Temples
 Temples of Kerala

Gallery

References

108 Shiva Temples
Shiva temples in Kerala
Hindu temples in Thrissur district